Four figure skating events were contested at the 1908 Summer Olympics in London, but they were held in October 1908, six months after most of the other Olympic events at the 1908 Games. The figure skating competition took place at the Prince's Skating Club, in the district of Knightsbridge. It was the first time that a winter sport had ever been included in the Olympic Games, sixteen years before the first Winter Olympics in Chamonix. The number of competitors was very low, with two events having only three entrants, guaranteeing a medal for participation.

Medal summary

Medalists

Medal table

Participating nations
21 figure skaters from 6 nations competed.

References

Sources

  (courtesy LA84 Foundation Sports Library)
 
 
 

 
1908 Summer Olympics events
1908
1908 in figure skating
International figure skating competitions hosted by the United Kingdom
Discontinued sports at the Summer Olympics